Below is a list of United States national Amateur Boxing Light Flyweight Champions, also known as United States Amateur Champions, along with the state or region which they represented.  The United States National Boxing Championships bestow the title of United States Amateur Champion on amateur boxers for winning the annual national amateur boxing tournament organized by USA Boxing, the national governing body for Olympic boxing and is the United States' member organization of the International Amateur Boxing Association (AIBA).  It is one of the four amateur boxing tournaments, the others being the National Golden Gloves Tournament, which crowns its own amateur light flyweight champion, the Police Athletic League Tournament, and the United States Armed Forces Tournament, all sending champions to the US Olympic Trials.  

1967 – Benny Gerolaga 
1968 – Harlan Marbley 
1969 – Dennis Mince 
1970 – Elijah Cooper 
1971 – Garry Griffin 
1972 – David Armstrong 
1973 – Albert Sandoval 
1974 – Claudell Atkins 
1975 – Claudell Atkins
1976 – Brett Summers 
1977 – Israel Acosta 
1978 – James Cullins 
1979 – Richard Sandoval 
1980 – Robert Shannon 
1981 – Jesse Benevidez 
1982 – Mario Lesperance 
1982 – Bryan Jones 
1983 – Paul Gonzales 
1984 – James Harris 
1985 – Brian Lonon 
1986 – Brian Lonon 
1987 – Brian Lonon 
1988 – Michael Carbajal 
1989 – Mark Johnson 
1990 – John Herrera 
1991 – Eric Griffin 
1992 – Bradley Martinez 
1993 – Albert Guardado 
1994 – Albert Guardado 
1995 – Pedro Pean 
1996 – Albert Guardado 
1997 – Gabriel Elizondo 
1998 – Ronald Siler 
1999 – Brian Viloria 
2000 – Nonito Donaire 
2001 – Ronald Siler 
2002 – Aaron Alafa 
2003 – Austreberto Juarez 
2004 – Austreberto Juarez 
2005 – Marco Rangel 
2006 – Luis Yáñez 
2007 – Luis Yáñez 
2008 – Ronald Siler
2009 – Miguel Cartagena

References
History

Light fly